Monica and Friends  (known as Turma da Mônica in Brazil, Mónica e Amigos in the European Portuguese dub and Monica's Gang in past translations) is a Brazilian series of cartoons based on the comic book Monica and Friends by Mauricio de Sousa. The series runs on Cartoon Network and previously on Globo, but in 2014, Globo stopped to air the series.

Six DVDs with episodes of the series were released, distributed by Paramount Home Entertainment. Globo displayed the newest episodes of the DVDs. New episodes were released in nine Cine Gibi movies. New episodes are posted on the programme's official YouTube channel after they air on Cartoon Network.

Episodes 
Monica and Friends has over 200 episodes. Almost each episode is part of each film.

The pilot (1976)

Episodes from As Aventuras da Turma da Mônica (1982)

Episodes from As Novas Aventuras da Turma da Mônica (1986)

Episodes from A Sereia do Rio (1986)

Episodes from O Bicho Papão (1987)

Episodes from A Estrelinha Magica (1988)

Episodes from Chico Bento, Oia a Onça! (1990)

Episodes from O Natal de Todos Nós (1992)

Episodes from Quadro a Quadro (1996)

Episodes from O Mônico (1997)

Episodes from O plano sangrento (1998)

Episodes from O estranho soro do Dr. X (1998)

Episodes from A ilha misteriosa (1999)

Episodes from 2002

Episodes from Cine Gibi (2004)

Episodes from Cine Gibi 2 (2005)

Episodes from Cine Gibi 3 - Planos Infalíveis (2008)

Episodes from 2009 
These flash-animated episodes were firstly released for Brazilian Cartoon Network, and later, as parts of Cine Gibi 4 - Meninos e Meninas and Cine Gibi 5 - Luz, Camera, Ação!.

Episodes from 2010

Rede Globo episodes and specials (2010–2013)

Cartoon Network episodes (2012–2015)

Cartoon Network's third series (2017–2018)

TV Cultura episodes (2017)

Cartoon Network/HBO Max episodes (2021–2022)

Voice cast

Mônica Toy 
Monica Toy is an animated series launched in May 2013 and produced by the studio for Tok & Stok's official YouTube channel to celebrate the 50th anniversary of Monica. The animation, done in chibi toy art, traces shows 30-second episodes with Monica, Jimmy Five, Smudge and Maggy (with occasional appearances Blu and Mauricio) doing funny things, Jimmy Five appears to get Monica's toy stuffed rabbit, Samson. It is animated in Flash.

External links 
 Monica and Friends official YouTube channel (in English)
 Monica and Friends on Cartoon Network (in Portuguese)
 "Monica and Friends": Jimmy and Monica decide to be superheroes at Rede Globo (in Portuguese)

References

Monica's Gang
1977 Brazilian television series debuts
Animated television series about children
Brazilian children's animated adventure television series
Brazilian children's animated comedy television series
Brazilian children's animated fantasy television series
Portuguese-language television shows
TV Globo original programming
HBO Max original programming
Television series based on Brazilian comics
Television shows based on comics